Microsoft School of the Future  (commonly referred to as the School of the Future) is a public high school located in Philadelphia, Pennsylvania, United States that serves grades 9 through 12 as part of the Philadelphia School District. The school opened on September 7, 2006.

History
After two and half years of planning, the School District of Philadelphia, Microsoft and The Prisco Group architectural firm designed "School of the Future." The design had to incorporate the principle of adaptation at any site, making it able to adjust to smaller or bigger student capacity and incorporate different curricula and programs. The design supports continuous, relevant and adaptive learning principles.

Recognitions
LEED Gold Certified

2006 DesignShare Award

2006 Reader's Digest: Best of America – Best High-Tech High

See also
Education
School
Classroom of the future

References

External links
Official website
School district section on HSOF and School of the Future's School Profile
Microsoft - Building the School of the future
Slashdot - "Microsoft's High School Opens in PA"
Microsoft - School of the Future Resource Kit
Schedule a visit to the School of the Future
School of the Future's BetaTech Computer Technology Club

High schools in Philadelphia
Educational institutions established in 2006
Public high schools in Pennsylvania
2006 establishments in Pennsylvania
West Philadelphia